Alycia Parks defeated Caroline Garcia in the final, 7–6(9–7), 7–5 to win the singles tennis title at the 2023 WTA Lyon Open. It was her first WTA Tour singles title.

Zhang Shuai was the defending champion, but lost in the second round to Maryna Zanevska.

Seeds

Draw

Finals

Top half

Bottom half

Qualifying

Seeds

Qualifiers

Qualifying draw

First qualifier

Second qualifier

Third qualifier

Fourth qualifier

Fifth qualifier

Sixth qualifier

References

External links 
Main draw  
Qualifying draw

2023 Singles
Lyon Open Singles